London Chartism, 1838–1848 is a 1982 book-length history of the 19th century Chartism social movement in London, as written by David Goodway and published by Cambridge University Press.

Further reading

External links 

 

1982 non-fiction books
English-language books
Chartism
History books about the United Kingdom
Cambridge University Press books